Amina Alaoui (born 1964) is a Moroccan interpreter of Andalusian classical music. She sings in Arabic, Classic Persian, Haketia, Spanish, and Portuguese.

Amina was born in 1964 in an aristocratic family in Fez, Morocco. At the age of six, she started to learn Andalusi classical music in her own family environment. She learned to play the piano and was initiated in European classical music by the conductor Mohamed Abou Drar. Amina also studied at the conservatory of Rabat from 1979 to 1981 with Ahmed Aydoun and Mohammed Ouassini and studied modern dancing with Marie-Odile Loakira and classic dancing with Vera Likatchova.

Amina went to school at Lycée Descartes and studied philology and Spanish and Arabic linguistics at the University of Madrid and the University of Granada.

Andalusian classical music
While studying in Granada, Amina did research on Arab-Andalusian and oriental music and specialized in Andalusian classical music, specifically in the gharnati (Arabic for "of Granada") style of music. She moved to Paris in 1986, where she continued her practical studies of gharnati music with Rachid Guerbas and Ahmed Piro. There she also studied European Medieval music with Henri Agnel and Persian classical music with Djalal Akhbari.  In 2011 she released Arco Iris (ECM), which bridged musical traditions of Portuguese fado, Spanish flamenco, and Persian and Arab-Andalusi classical music.

Discography
Gharnati:Musique arabo-andalouse du Maroc (1995)
Alcántara (1998)
Gharnati: En Concert (2009)
Siwan (ECM, 2009) with Jon Balke
Arco Iris (2011, ECM)

Collaborations
Lluís Llach: Un Pont de Mar Blava (1993)
Rachid Taha: Diwan (1998)
Music From The Heart of the World: Sounds True Anthology (2000)
Women's Sacred Chants (2003)
Rachid Taha: Diwan Live in Concert (2005)

References

1964 births
20th-century Moroccan women singers
21st-century Moroccan women singers
Living people
People from Fez, Morocco